This is a list of the transfers for the 2011–12 A-League season. It includes all transfers to an A-League club, but not all players leaving A-League clubs. Promotions from youth squads to the first squad of the same club are also not included.

1 Adelaide United approached North Queensland Fury asking for an early release which was granted allowing the player to play for his new club for the remainder of the 2010–11 Season
2 McGowan is on loan from Hearts of Midlothian for the 2011–12 A-League season
3 Ambesager Yosief & Samuel Tesfagabr are both non-visa foreign quoted players, as they both possess Australian citizenship
4 Short-term injury replacement contract
5 Milligan is on loan from Jeju United until the end of the 2011–12 A-League season 
6 Sutton is on loan from Hearts of Midlothian for four months
7 Luzardo is on loan from Kitchee until the end of the 2011–12 A-League season

References

External links
 A-League official website

A-League Men transfers
trans
Football transfers summer 2011
Football transfers winter 2011–12
Football transfers winter 2010–11